Curbed is an American real estate and urban design website founded as a blog by Lockhart Steele in 2006. The full website, founded in 2010, featured sub-pages dedicated to specific real estate markets and metropolitan areas across the United States.  Steele once described Curbed.com as an "Architectural Digest after a three-martini lunch.” The site hosted an annual contest, the Curbed Cup, to pick the best neighborhood in each city.

In November 2013, Vox Media purchased the Curbed Network, which, apart from Curbed, also included dining website Eater and fashion website Racked. The paper reported that the cash-and-stock deal was worth between $20 million and $30 million. , as a part of a downward trend of layoffs and restructuring of many venture capital-funded sites, and the effects of the COVID-19 pandemic, many of Curbed's area-specific sites closed, leaving New York City as the sole remaining metropolitan focus. In October 2020, Curbed was integrated into the magazine New York.

Former sub-pages specific to metropolitan areas and real estate markets included:
 Atlanta
 Austin
 Boston
 Chicago
 Detroit 
 the Hamptons
 Los Angeles
 Miami
 New Orleans
 Philadelphia
 San Francisco 
 Seattle
 Washington, D.C.

References

External links
 

American real estate websites
Architecture websites
Mass media companies based in New York City
Vox Media
American companies established in 2006
Real estate companies established in 2006
Design companies established in 2006
Internet properties established in 2006
2006 establishments in the United States